Lanlana Tararudee (born 7 July 2004) is a tennis player from Thailand.

Tararudee has a career-high WTA singles ranking of 365, achieved on 30 January 2023, and a career-high WTA doubles ranking of 577, achieved on 30 January 2023. Tararudee has won two singles titles on the TF.

Playing for the Thailand, Tararudee has accumulated a win–loss record of 3–0. Tararudee won her first and major ITF title in her career, defeating compatriot Mananchaya Sawangkaew in the final at the ITF40W tournament in Nonthaburi, Thailand.

Tararudee made her WTA Tour main-draw debut at the 2023 Thailand Open, where she received a wildcard into the singles draw.

ITF Circuit finals

Singles: 2 (2 titles)

Fed Cup participation

Doubles: 3 (3–0)

References

External links

2004 births
Living people
Lanlana Tararudee
Lanlana Tararudee